The Public Services (Social Value) Act 2012 is an Act of the Parliament of the United Kingdom. The Act calls for all public sector commissioning to factor in ("have regard to") economic, social and environmental well-being in connection with public services contracts; and for connected purposes. It requires that all public bodies in England and Wales, including Local Authorities, and NHS organisations to consider how the services they commission and procure which are expected to cost more than the thresholds provided for in the Public Contracts Regulations might improve the social, economic and environmental well-being of the area. Third Sector organisations such as Social Enterprise UK pushed for the introduction of the legislation. In early drafts the Bill had a far greater focus on increasing public spending with social enterprises. The final text of the Act is focused on ensuring public spending leverages value in all three recognized domains or pillars of Sustainable Development, or the triple bottom line.

Passage
The Bill's original title was the Public Services (Social Enterprise and Social Value) Bill. It was presented to the House of Commons in 2010 by Chris White MP, the Member of Parliament for Warwick and Leamington as a Private Members' Bill. It received Royal Assent in March 2012.

Effects
Lord Young, the Prime Minister's Adviser on Enterprise, conducted a review of the Act, which examined how the Act has been performing in its first 2 years. The report contains a number of useful case studies, practical guidance on how to apply the Act, and a framework and principles for measurement.

Procurement Policy Note 10/12  providing advice for public sector staff was produced when the Act came into force in January 2013. The note confirms that contracts for goods and works, and contracts below the relevant monetary thresholds in the Public Contracts Regulations, are not covered by the Act.

Government also conducted a one-year on update  on the Act.

Research by National Voices and Social Enterprise UK found that only 13% of clinical commissioning groups demonstrate that they are actively committed to pursuing social value in their procurement and commissioning decisions. Only 13% of sustainability and transformation plans mention the idea.

References

External links
 Bill as enacted

United Kingdom Acts of Parliament 2012